Hoằng Pháp Temple (Chùa Hoằng Pháp, built 1957) is a temple in Hóc Môn, a suburb of Ho Chi Minh City.

References

Temples in Ho Chi Minh City